Peter Sotos (born April 17, 1960) is an American writer and musician. In his books, Sotos examines sadistic sexual criminals and sexually violent pornography, particularly involving children. His writings are interpreted by some as commenting on media hypocrisy around these issues. His books are often first person narratives, taking on the point of view of the sexual predator in order to explore sadistic and pedophilic sexual impulses.

Education 
Sotos is a graduate of Holy Cross High School. He attended Northern Illinois University for one year and studied at the School of the Art Institute of Chicago for four years.

Books 
Lazy (1999) examines the public fascination with sex crimes, and their influence on artworks such as the painting Myra by Marcus Harvey.
Selfish, Little (2004) recounts the murder of Lesley Ann Downey by British Moors Murderers Ian Brady and Myra Hindley in 1964.
Predicate (2005) explores the Dunblane Massacre in Scotland in 1996 and the motives and life of its perpetrator Thomas Watt Hamilton. Other topics covered include Operation Ore, the Wonderland murders, Russian orphanages, Megan's Law, and non-nude teen websites.
Comfort and Critique (2005) explores the hidden motives of reporters and citizens as shown by their reactions to sexual crimes.
Show Adult (2007) investigates the experience of pornography. The book also analyzes the TV shows Supernanny and To Catch a Predator as publicly acceptable forms of child pornography.
Lordotics (2008) deals with sex offenders and the art of photography.
Pure Filth (2012) details transcripts of the gonzo movies porn star Jamie Gillis produced during the 1990s. Gillis adds an introduction to each transcript. Sotos, who was a friend of Gillis, brings his own perspective to these records. The book was completed a few days before Gillis died in February 2010.
Desistance (2014) is focused on the works of French photographer Antoine D'Agata.
Ingratitude (2018) is a monologue.
Lionel Maunz Peter Sotos (2021) is a collaboration with the titular contemporary artist.

Musical career 

From 1983 to Bird Seed released in 2003, Sotos was a member of the British power electronics group Whitehouse.

In 1992, Sotos released the solo album Buyer's Market, which consisted of sound collages of spoken word samples from parents, law-enforcement officers and victims of sex crimes. The album was produced by Steve Albini. Sotos then released Proxy  and Waitress  in 2005.

Jamie Stewart from Xiu Xiu often mentions Sotos as an influence.

Discography

Art 

Peter Sotos makes video collages. He notably presented Waitress I, II and III at the Palais de Tokyo in April 2005.

A selection of Sotos' paper archives has been shown for the first time in 2017 at the New Galerie in Paris.

In popular culture 

In his movie Love (2015), the Argentine film director Gaspar Noé shows Lazy, one of Sotos' books, in the hero's bookshelves. The American writer is also thanked in the closing credits.

Works  

 Pure, 1984-1985, Self-published and released two issues, with a third having been completed before controversy of publication led to a now-infamous trial.
 Parasite, 1993-1995, Self-published twenty issues.
 Total Abuse: Collected Writings, 1984-1995: Pure, Tool, Parasite, 1995 (Goad to Hell Enterprises)
 Index, 1996, Printed in 1998 (Creation Books)
 Special, 1998 (Rude Shape)
 Lazy, 1999 (Creation Books)
 Tick, 2000 (Creation Books)
 Selfish, Little: The Annotated Lesley Ann Downey, 2004 (Void Books)
 Proxy: Peter Sotos Pornography 1991-2000, 2005 (Creation Books). A compendium of five of Sotos' works (Tool, Special, Tick, Index and Lazy). First edition, with CD by Sotos and Steve Albini.
 Comfort and Critique, 2005 (Void Books)
 Predicate, 2005 (Creation Books)
 Waitress, 2005 (Creation Books). Came as an extra for those who preordered a copy of Predicate from Creation Books.
 Show Adult, 2007 (Creation Books)
 Waitress, 2007 (Creation Books). Separate volume from the one included with Predicate. Came with orders of Show Adult in hardcover.
 Lordotics, 2008 (Creation Books)
 Perfect: The Collected Peter Sotos Volume One, 2009 (Creation Books)
 Waitress, 2009 (Creation Books). Third in a series of additional material offered in limited editions from Creation. Came with pre orders of Perfect.
 Public: The Collected Peter Sotos Volume Two, 2009 (Creation Books)
 Waitress, 2009 (Creation Books) Fourth in a series of additional material offered in limited editions from Creation. Came with pre orders of Public.
 Private: The Collected Peter Sotos Volume Three, 2009 (Creation Books)
 Waitress, 2009 (Creation Books). Fifth in a series of additional material offered in limited editions from Creation. Came with pre orders of Private.
 Kept: The Collected Peter Sotos Volume Four, 2010 (Creation Books)
 Waitress, 2010 (Creation Books). Sixth in a series of additional material offered in limited editions from Creation. Came with pre orders of Kept.
 Mine, 2011 (Creation Books, reprinted in paperback by Nine-Banded Books in 2013)
 Pure Filth, 2012 (Feral House) with Jamie Gillis.
 Tool, 2013 (Nine-Banded Books). First printing as a stand-alone volume.
 Home, 2013 (Kiddiepunk) with images by Michael Salerno.
 Desistance, 2014 (Nine-Banded Books)
 Ingratitude, 2018 (Nine-Banded Books)
Lionel Maunz Peter Sotos, 2021 (Nine-Banded Books & Amphetamine Sulphate)
Missed. Better Still., 2022 (Amphetamine Sulphate)

Texts featuring Peter Sotos 

 Apocalypse Culture, edited by Adam Parfrey, interview with Peter Sotos by Paul Lemos (Amok Press, 1987)
 Apocalypse Culture II, edited by Adam Parfrey, chapter by Peter Sotos (Feral House, 2000)
 The Gates of Janus by Ian Brady, afterword by Peter Sotos (Feral House, 2001)
 Straight to Hell: 20th Century Suicides, edited by Namida King, contributed to by Peter Sotos (Creation Books, 2003)
 .45 Dangerous Minds: The Most Intense Interviews from Seconds Magazine, edited by Steven Blush and George Petros (Creation Books, 2005)
 Pornocracy by Catherine Breillat, afterword by Peter Sotos (Semiotext(e), 2008)
 The Gates of Janus: Expanded Edition by Ian Brady, new afterword by Peter Sotos: Bait (Feral House, 2015)

Pure magazine and after 

In 1984, while the day care sex abuse hysteria phenomenon was sweeping the nation and while attending the School of the Art Institute of Chicago, Sotos began producing the controversial magazine Pure, notable as the first zine dedicated to serial killer lore. The original publications are now collectors' items.

In addition to offering many details about the crimes of serial killers and Nazis, the text in the magazine praises them, describing them using such terms as "genius", "glorious", "exemplary", and "illustrious". The text is juxtaposed with pictures and newspaper clippings relevant to the crimes discussed, showing that the media also abuses the victims. A short manifesto introducing the first issue says the magazine "satiates and encourages true lusts."

A photocopy from a magazine of child pornography was used as the cover of issue #2 of Pure which led to Sotos pleading guilty to possession of child pornography, receiving a suspended sentence. A copy of the magazine was found by Scotland Yard in Edinburgh, in the home of a suspect in a series of child abductions, murders and grave robbings, which led to Sotos' arrest.

Despite his early legal troubles, Sotos continues to garner support for his ideas and literary output: in the foreword to the French edition of Index (1999) the publisher Jean-Jacques Pauvert compared him to Marquis de Sade; the American author Bruce Benderson has been analyzing his writings for La Nouvelle Revue Française; in 2012 Sotos joined Dennis Cooper for a lecture at the Centre Georges Pompidou; in 2015 the German contemporary art magazine Texte zur Kunst published “Proxy: Peter Sotos in Conversation”.

References

External links 
 Nine-Banded Books
 Feral House
 Laurence Viallet
 Peter Sotos: A Case Study in Lust and the Unconditioned by Michael Lujan
 Fucked in the Head by Travis Jeppesen
 Peter Sotos : Aucun autre crime que l'amour du crime by Christophe Bourseiller
 Instinct, Drive, and Reality: An Interview with Peter Sotos (The Hoover Hog)
 Peter Sotos Day by Dennis Cooper
 Interview with Peter Sotos by Brandon Stosuy (Fanzine)
 Tesco Fest 2011, Brooklyn NY
 Natt&Dag (May 2011)
 The Putrid Voyeurisms of Peter Sotos by Blake Butler (Vice)
 Basilica Soundscape 2013, Hudson NY (Pitchfork)

1960 births
Living people
American crime writers
Musicians from Chicago
Writers from Chicago
School of the Art Institute of Chicago alumni
American writers of Greek descent
Obscenity controversies in literature
American industrial musicians
American noise musicians
American sound artists
Northern Illinois University alumni
Music controversies
Whitehouse (band) members
American people convicted of child pornography offenses